Rasmus Lindkvist (born 16 May 1990) is a Swedish footballer who plays professionally for GIF Sundsvall as a wing back.

Club career
On 7 January 2022, Lindkvist returned to Sweden and signed a two-year deal with GIF Sundsvall.

Career statistics

Honours
AIK
 Allsvenskan: 2018

References

External links 
 

1990 births
Living people
Footballers from Stockholm
Swedish footballers
Sweden international footballers
Dalkurd FF players
Östersunds FK players
Vålerenga Fotball players
AIK Fotboll players
Hamarkameratene players
GIF Sundsvall players
Allsvenskan players
Superettan players
Ettan Fotboll players
Eliteserien players
Norwegian First Division players
Swedish expatriate footballers
Expatriate footballers in Norway
Swedish expatriate sportspeople in Norway
Association football defenders
Association football midfielders